Lo Faber (born May 20, 1966, in Wilkes Barre, Pennsylvania) is a musician and a college professor. He co-founded the influential New York City jam band God Street Wine. Though each member of the band has composed some of their songs, Faber is the primary songwriter and band leader. He and Aaron Maxwell share lead vocal and lead guitar duties.

His mother Ellen Faber played in a bluegrass band when he was young and he recalls that his mother's band "rehearsed directly under my bedroom and I remember many night when I couldn't sleep all night for listening to them practicing their harmonies and learning new tunes." He grew up in rural Belle Mead, New Jersey and in high school began by playing the bass and later the guitar in several bands around Princeton, New Jersey with future God Street Wine drummer Tom Osander. One band, Aid to the Choking Victim, briefly included Blues Traveler bass player Bobby Sheehan.

For a time in the mid 80's after graduating high school he worked for the family business, the Eberhard Faber GmbH pencil company, but was "pretty miserable wearing a suit and selling pencils" and by 1986 he'd enrolled at the Manhattan School of Music to study jazz with future God Street Wine bassist Dan Pifer. By 1991 the band had built a large following playing clubs in New York City such as The Wetlands Preserve and Nightingales bar, and in 1992 began what would become several years of touring and recording.

God Street Wine broke up in 1999 and Faber has since developed solo projects which include the rock musicals Henry's House (2001) and Friday Night Freakshow (2003). Soon after writing Henry's House he toured for a year with members of the Ominous Seapods as the Lo Faber Band playing material from Henry's House and God Street Wine. On July 9 and 10, 2010 God Street Wine reunited its original lineup for two shows at New York's Gramercy Theatre. The concerts were a benefit for the National Multiple Sclerosis Society. Faber pursued a PhD in early 19th-century American History at Princeton University. After earning his doctorate in 2012, he became a Visiting Assistant Professor of History at Loyola University New Orleans. From Spring 2015 until his departure at the end of the 2019 school year. Faber was the main professor of Loyola's Music Industry Department for the Intro to Music Industry courses.

2015: "Building the Land of Dreams"
In 2015 Faber published "Building the Land of Dreams New Orleans and the Transformation of Early America" through Princeton University Press. It was the Winner of the 2015 Kemper and Leila Williams Prize in Louisiana History, Historic New Orleans Collection and the Louisiana Historical Association.

2019
In April 2019 Relix Magazine published an interview with Faber about the history of New Orleans relative to Jazz Fest. 
In the Spring of 2019, Faber announced his intention to return to making music full time after some years as a History Professor. On November 22, 2019, Faber released Bottomland under the pseudonym Doctor Lo.

2020
Faber was a couple of months into a support tour for "Bottomland" when his touring activities were halted due to the outbreak of the Covid-19 Pandemic. He soon pivoted to twice weekly live streams via his Facebook and YouTube pages.

2021
On June 18, 2021 Faber released "Claiborne Avenue." He supported the release by touring with a newly formed band, dubbed "Le Band."

Discography
Solo Albums

As "Lo Faber"

As "Doctor Lo"

As "Doctor Lo Trio"

As a Producer

with God Street Wine

+ Cassette Only

Singles

Notes

External links
 

Songwriters from Pennsylvania
Living people
1966 births
Guitarists from Pennsylvania
20th-century American guitarists